The coronation of George V and his wife Mary as King and Queen of the United Kingdom and the British Dominions, and as Emperor and Empress of India, took place at Westminster Abbey, London, on Thursday 22 June 1911. This was the second of four such events held during the 20th century and the last to be attended by royal representatives of the great continental European empires.

Preparations

Planning

The overall planning of the coronation was theoretically the role of the Earl Marshal, a hereditary office held by the Dukes of Norfolk for several centuries. At the coronation of King Edward VII in 1902, the driving force had been Viscount Esher in his capacity as Secretary to the Office of Works, a position which had since been filled by Sir Schomberg Kerr McDonnell. However, in the interim, the Earl Marshal, Henry Fitzalan-Howard, 15th Duke of Norfolk, had reasserted his ancient right to organise the great state events, despite having a personal dislike of ceremonial and having little capability as an organiser. The Earl Marshal had no permanent staff and was obliged to appoint a new one for each event. This arrangement had proved highly unsatisfactory for Edward VII's state funeral, when the ceremonial directions were found to be full of errors and had to be rewritten by courtiers on the previous evening, the printed order of service was wrong, and the seating of guests was alleged to be "a mosaic of indecision and confusion". King George described Norfolk as "a charming, honourable, straightforward little gentleman, the finest in the world. But as a man of business he is absolutely impossible".

Despite the objections of the College of Heralds and the Duke of Norfolk, a compromise was reached at the insistence of the Prime Minister, H. H. Asquith, whereby Norfolk would be chairman of the Coronation Executive Committee, but the detailed work would be done by the professional staff of the Office of Works rather than by Norfolk's appointees.

Infrastructure
As with all modern British coronations, a temporary extension or annexe was built at the west front of Westminster Abbey to allow the forming up of the processions before their entry into the church. As in the 1902 coronation, it was designed by the architect Alfred Young Nutt in the Gothic Revival style, matching the architecture of the abbey itself. Inside the abbey, the traditional ceremonial areas known as the theatre and the sacrarium had to be constructed, along with the galleries and boxes to accommodate the congregation. Following the arrangements for 1902, it was decided to limit the congregation to 6,000, far fewer than at earlier coronations. More than 50 grandstands were erected along the route of the processions, varying in size from seating 250 to 3,500 spectators each. The construction of these required 2,100 Imperial tons (2,134 tonnes) of timber and 70 tons (71 tonnes) of bolts, nails and screws.

Festival of Empire

The Festival of Empire opened on 12 May 1911 at the Crystal Palace in London, an exhibition of British and Imperial trade and culture to celebrate the upcoming coronation.

The service

The order of service was prepared by Claude Jenkins, the Lambeth Palace librarian, an eccentric character who was an antiquarian and patristic scholar. He was supervised by Armitage Robinson, the Dean of Westminster, who insisted that innovation be balanced by tradition. In fact, there was little change from the 1902 coronation, or at least that which had been intended, since the service had been shortened because of Edward's poor health. Randall Davidson, who as the Bishop of Winchester, had largely compiled the 1902 coronation service, was now Archbishop of Canterbury. Davidson sought the advice of Frank Edward Brightman, a liturgist from Magdalen College, Oxford. The main changes were to the words spoken at the actual crowning, which replaced those first used at the coronation of James II with a translation of the simpler medieval form, and the coronation sermon, which had been omitted in 1902, was reintroduced for the last time, but in a shorter form. The service was conducted by Davidson, including the crowning of the queen, which in 1902 had been delegated to the Archbishop of York.

Music
The Director of Music, as in 1902, was Sir Frederick Bridge. As at the previous event, Bridge aimed to produce a celebration of four hundred years of English music, including work by Thomas Tallis, John Merbecke and George Frederick Handel. Bridge himself wrote a new anthem, Rejoice in the Lord, O ye righteous, the tenor solo for which was performed by Edward Lloyd. The organist was Walter Alcock, who also wrote a new setting for the Sanctus. Sir Hubert Parry wrote an orchestral introduction for his setting of Psalm 122, I was glad which had made a great impact at the 1902 coronation, and also a new setting of the Te Deum, which was less well received, perhaps because the choir was exhausted at the end of the three-hour service. More successful was a new setting of the Gloria by Charles Villiers Stanford which was also used at the coronations of 1937 and 1953. New orchestral music included a Coronation March by Edward Elgar, who despite being awarded the Order of Merit in the coronation honours list, inexplicably refused to attend in person.

The Processions-in-State

The processions to the Abbey
The first of three processions left Buckingham Palace at 9:30 am. It consisted of representatives of foreign royal families and governments, carried in fourteen carriages. The second procession had five state landaus for members of the British royal family; the fifth contained the King and Queen's children, the Prince of Wales, Princess Mary and the young Princes Albert, Henry and George. The third procession brought the officers of state in a further four carriages and the twenty-fifth and final carriage, the Gold State Coach carrying the King and Queen. They were surrounded by equerries, aides-de-camp and the commanders of the armed forces mounted on horseback, all escorted by Yeomen of the Guard, colonial and Indian cavalry and the Royal Horse Guards.

The return processions
Following the coronation service, the three processions returned to the palace in reverse order and by an extended route, passing through Pall Mall, St James's Street, Piccadilly and Constitution Hill. Some 45,000 soldiers and sailors from across the empire either participated in the procession or lined the route.

After the end of the procession, there was an unexpected innovation, the appearance of the King and Queen on the balcony of Buckingham Palace. This created such excitement that the soldiers outside the palace broke ranks and joined in the cheering. According to one account, "some of them put their helmets on their rifles and waved them vigorously aloft". That evening, the principal buildings in central London were illuminated with strings of electric lights until 12:30 am.

The royal progress through the City
On the following day, the return procession was reconstituted for a further parade through the streets of the capital, this time passing along The Strand and into the City of London, past St Paul's Cathedral, across the River Thames by London Bridge, along Borough High Street, back over Westminster Bridge and finally returning up The Mall to Buckingham Palace. Instead of the Gold Coach, the king and queen were driven in an open landau. The place of the foreign royalty was taken by Indian princes and colonial rulers. This time, 55,000 troops were on duty.

The Coronation Review of the Fleet

On 24 June, the King and Queen attended the Coronation Review of the Fleet at Spithead between the naval base of Portsmouth and the Isle of Wight. The Royal Navy had 167 warships in attendance, together with 18 ships from foreign navies; they were arranged in five lines, each 6 miles (10 kilometres) in length, through which the royal party steamed in review, aboard the royal yacht, . The crowd of spectators ashore was estimated to number a quarter of a million.

The Delhi Coronation Durbar

On 11 November 1911, the King and Queen left Portsmouth aboard  bound for the Indian Empire. Arriving in Bombay (present day Mumbai) on 2 December, they reached Delhi by train on 7 December for a ceremonial state entry. The durbar itself was on 12 December, attended by an estimated 100,000 people, both watching and participating.

Guests

British Royal Family

 The Prince of Wales, the King and Queen's son
 Prince Albert, the King and Queen's son
 Princess Mary, the King and Queen's daughter
 Prince Henry, the King and Queen's son
 Prince George, the King and Queen's son
 The Princess Royal and The Duke of Fife, the King's sister and brother-in-law
 Princess Alexandra, the King's niece
 Princess Maud, the King's niece
  The Dowager Duchess of Saxe-Coburg and Gotha (Duchess of Edinburgh), the King's paternal aunt by marriage
  The Crown Princess and Crown Prince of Romania, the King's first cousin and the King's third cousin (representing the King of the Romanians)
 Princess and Prince Christian of Schleswig-Holstein, the King's paternal aunt and uncle
 Prince Albert of Schleswig-Holstein, the King's first cousin
 Princess Helena Victoria of Schleswig-Holstein, the King's first cousin
 Princess Marie Louise of Schleswig-Holstein, the King's first cousin
 Princess Louise, Duchess of Argyll and The Duke of Argyll, the King's paternal aunt and uncle
 The Duke and Duchess of Connaught and Strathearn, the King's paternal uncle and aunt
  The Crown Princess and Crown Prince of Sweden, the King's first cousin and the Queen's third cousin (representing the King of Sweden)
 Prince Arthur of Connaught, the King's first cousin
 Princess Patricia of Connaught, the King's first cousin
 The Dowager Duchess of Albany, the King's paternal aunt by marriage
 Princess and Prince Alexander of Teck, the King's first cousin and the Queen's brother
  The Duke and Duchess of Saxe-Coburg and Gotha (Duke and Duchess of Albany), the King's first cousin and the King's second cousin
 Princess Henry of Battenberg, the King's paternal aunt
 Prince Alexander of Battenberg, the King's first cousin
 Prince Leopold of Battenberg, the King's first cousin
 Prince Maurice of Battenberg, the King's first cousin
 Princess and Prince Louis of Battenberg, the King's first cousin and her husband
 Princess Louise of Battenberg, the King's first cousin once removed
 Prince George of Battenberg,  the King's first cousin once removed
 The Duke and Duchess of Teck, the Queen's brother and sister-in-law
 Prince George of Teck, the Queen's nephew
 Princess Mary of Teck, the Queen's niece
 Princess Helena of Teck, the Queen's niece
 Princess Victor of Hohenlohe-Langenburg, widow of the King's half-first cousin once removed
 Countess Feodora Gleichen, the King's half-second cousin
 Count Edward Gleichen, the King's half-second cousin
 Countess Valda Machel, the King's half-second cousin
 Countess Helena Gleichen, the King's half-second cousin
 The Earl of Munster, the King's third cousin
 Lt. Col. Charles FitzClarence, the King's third cousin

Foreign royals
  The German Crown Prince and Crown Princess, the King's first cousin once removed and his wife (representing the German Emperor)
  The Hereditary Princess of Saxe-Meiningen, the King's first cousin (representing the Duke of Saxe-Meiningen)
  Prince Henry of Prussia, the King's first cousin
 The Hereditary Princess and Prince of Hesse, the King's first cousin and her husband
  The Grand Duke and Grand Duchess of Hesse and by Rhine, the King's first cousin and his wife
  The Crown Prince of Denmark, the King's first cousin (representing the King of Denmark)
  The Duke and Duchess of Sparta, the King's first cousins, (representing the King of the Hellenes)
  Prince George of Greece and Denmark, the King's double first cousin once removed
  Prince and Princess George of Greece and Denmark, the King's first cousin and his wife
  Princess and Prince Maximilian of Baden, the King's first cousin and her husband (representing the Grand Duke of Baden)
 The Hereditary Prince of Hanover, the King's first cousin
  The Grand Duchess and Grand Duke of Mecklenburg-Schwerin, the King's first cousin and her husband
 Prince Ernest Augustus of Hanover and Cumberland, the King's first cousin
  The Grand Duke of Mecklenburg-Strelitz, the Queen's first cousin
  The Crown Princess and Crown Prince of Montenegro, the Queen's first cousin once removed and her husband (representing the King of Montenegro)
  The Hereditary Grand Duke of Mecklenburg-Strelitz, the Queen's first cousin once removed
  Prince Philipp of Saxe-Coburg and Gotha, the King's second cousin once removed
  Prince Leopold Clement of Saxe-Coburg and Gotha, the King's third cousin
 The Duke of Schleswig-Holstein,  the King's third cousin
  The Prince of Tarnovo, the King's third cousin (representing the Tsar of Bulgaria)
  Duke Albrecht of Württemberg,  the King's third cousin (representing the King of Württemberg)
  The Crown Prince of the Ottoman Empire (representing the Ottoman Sultan)
  Archduke Karl of Austria (representing the Austrian Emperor)
  The Duke and Duchess of Aosta (representing the King of Italy)
  Grand Duke Boris Vladimirovich of Russia (representing the Tsar of Russia)
  Infante Ferdinand of Spain (representing the King of Spain)
  Prince and Princess Higashifushimi of Japan (representing the Emperor of Japan)
  The Crown Prince of Serbia (representing the King of Serbia)
  Prince Chakrabongse Bhuvanath of Siam (representing the King of Siam)
  Prince Rupprecht of Bavaria (representing the Prince Regent of Bavaria)
  Prince and Princess Johann Georg of Saxony (representing the King of Saxony)
  The Prince of the Netherlands (representing the Queen of the Netherlands)
  Prince Zaizhen of China (representing the Emperor of China)
  Prince Kassa Haile Darge of Ethiopia (representing the Emperor of Ethiopia)
  Prince Mohammed Ali Tewfik of Egypt (representing the Khedive of Egypt and Sudan)
  The Hereditary Prince of Monaco (representing the Prince of Monaco)
  Madho Rao Scindia, Maharaja of Gwalior
  Pratap Singh, Maharaja of Idar
  Ganga Singh, Maharaja of Bikaner

Other dignitaries
  John Hays Hammond (representing the President of the United States)
  Major General Adolphus Greely of the United States Army
  Vice-Admiral Fauques de Jonquieres (representing the French Republic)
  Monsignor Eugenio Maria Giuseppe Giovanni Pacelli (representing the Holy See)

See also
 Coronation of the British monarch
 List of British coronations
 King George V Coronation Medal
 1911 Coronation Honours

References

Sources

Books

Matthew, H. C. G. (September 2004; online edition May 2009) George V (1865–1936), Oxford Dictionary of National Biography, Oxford University Press, doi:10.1093/ref:odnb/33369, retrieved 1 May 2010 (Subscription required)

Articles

External links
 
 
 
 
 

George V
1911 in London
George V
Westminster Abbey
Mary of Teck
1911 in the British Empire
June 1911 events
1910s in the City of Westminster